Ø (and ø) is a Scandinavian vowel letter.

The letter Ø or the symbol ∅ (a circle crossed by a diagonal slash) etc. may also refer to:

Language

 Close-mid front rounded vowel
 Zero (linguistics) (∅)
 Berber Academy yah (ⵁ), a Tifinagh letter, corresponding to "h"

Science, technology and engineering
 Slashed zero (0̸), a representation of the number 0 (zero) to distinguish it from the letter O
 The symbol for diameter (⌀), U+2300 in Unicode 
 A symbol to represent a phenyl group
 Empty set ( or ∅ as a character) in mathematical set theory, U+2205 in Unicode

Other uses
 Latitude, for geographical coordinates
 Ø, Denmark, a piece of land in Jutland, Denmark
 Half-diminished seventh chord, in music
 Ø, the solo identity of Finnish musician Mika Vainio of electronic music band Pan Sonic
 Ø (Disambiguation), a 2010 studio album by Florida post-hardcore band Underoath

Similar symbols

Circle with a diagonal slash
 Circled division slash (⊘), U+2298 in Unicode 
 No entry sign (🚫), U+1F6AB in Unicode

Circle crossed by a vertical bar 
 Voiceless bilabial fricative (IPA: ɸ)
 Phi (Φ and φ), a Greek letter, corresponding to "f" or "ph"
 Ef (Cyrillic) (Ф and ф), a Cyrillic letter, corresponding to "f" or "ph"

Circle with a vertical bar 

 Yah (ⵀ), a Tifinagh letter, corresponding to "h" or "b"

Circle with a horizontal bar
 Voiceless dental fricative (IPA: θ)
 Theta (Θ and θ), a Greek letter, corresponding to "th"
 Theta nigrum (ꝋ) for "obiit" ="died"
 Fita (Ѳ and ѳ), an Old Cyrillic letter, corresponding to "f" and transliterating Greek theta
 Oe (Cyrillic) (Ө and ө), Cyrillic barred O, representing an open-mid front rounded vowel in some Turkic and Mongolic languages
 Yab (ⴱ), a Tifinagh letter, corresponding to "b"
 Waterline (⦵), the line where the hull of a ship meets the surface of the water
 Standard state (⦵), in chemistry

See also
 Null (disambiguation)
 Null symbol (disambiguation)
 Barred O (disambiguation)
 0 (disambiguation)
 Theta (⦰), in trigonometry